When a Man Loves is a 1927 American silent historical drama film directed by Alan Crosland and produced and distributed by Warner Bros. The picture stars John Barrymore and features Dolores Costello in the frequently filmed story of Abbe Prevost's 1731 novel Manon Lescaut. The UK release title was His Lady.

The film was the third feature from Warners to have a pre-recorded Vitaphone soundtrack.

Plot
Chevalier Fabien des Grieux, who has forsworn the world for the church, falls passionately in love with young Manon Lescaut when he encounters her en route to a convent with her brother André. The lustful Comte Guillot de Morfontaine offers André a tempting sum for Manon, and learning of their bargain, Fabien takes her to Paris, where they spend an idyllic week in a garret. André finds her, persuades her to leave Fabien, and tries to force her into an alliance with Morfontaine—then rescues Manon from the advances of a brutal Apache. Fabien, crushed to believe that Manon has become Morfontaine's mistress, is about to take his vows but is deterred by her love for him. King Louis sees Manon in Richelieu's drawing room and wins her. The rejected Morfontaine orders her arrest and deportation, but he is killed by Fabien, who joins Manon on a convict ship bound for America. After inciting the convicts to mutiny, he escapes with her in a small boat.

Cast

 John Barrymore as Chevalier Fabien des Grieux
 Dolores Costello as Manon Lescaut
 Warner Oland as André Lescaut
 Sam De Grasse as Comte Guillot de Morfontaine
 Holmes Herbert as Jean Tiberge
 Stuart Holmes as Louis XV, King of France
 Bertram Grassby as Le Duc de Richelieu
 Tom Santschi as Captain of convict boat

 Marcelle Corday as Marie, a servant
 Charles Clary as a lay brother
 Templar Saxe as Baron Chevral
 Eugenie Besserer as the landlady
 Rose Dione as Nana
 Noble Johnson as an Apache
 Tom Wilson as convict aboard the boat
 Myrna Loy as woman on ship

Source:

Production
When a Man Loves re-teamed Barrymore and Costello after 1925's The Sea Beast. The film is the third and last film in Barrymore's first Warners contract, having been preceded by The Sea Beast and Don Juan. He and director Alan Crosland re-teamed at United Artists to make The Beloved Rogue, another French costume story that was selected because of the popularity of When a Man Loves. This film version of When a Man Loves repeats the ending of The Sea Beast, providing a happy ending rather than the tragic ending of the source material.

Many of the people who worked on the previous year's Don Juan worked on When a Man Loves, such as director Crosland, writer Bess Meredyth, editor Harold McCord, and director of photography Byron Haskin.

Response
When the film played in the theater, the audience was so amazed that the sound was coming from the speakers, not from an actual live orchestra. A New York Times reviewer wrote that he, and probably the rest of the audience, forgot the fact that there was actually no orchestra in the theater. At the end of the film, The Vitaphone Symphony Orchestra was shown to the audience for about 15 seconds.

Box office
According to Warner Bros. records, the film earned $732,000 in the U.S. and $305,000 in other markets.

Premiere Vitaphone short subjects
When a Man Loves premiered at the Selwyn Theatre in New York City on February 3, 1927.

Home media
On June 16, 2009, When a Man Loves was released on DVD from Warner's Archive Collection. This was the film's first home video appearance.

Other film versions
 Manon Lescaut (1914)
 Manon Lescaut (1926)
 Manon Lescaut (1940)

See also
 List of early Warner Bros. sound and talking features
 John Barrymore filmography

References

External links

 
 
 
 
 lobby poster
  alternate poster(rare)HeritageAuctions
 accessible version of  alternate poster
 The full film on Internet Archive

1927 films
1927 romantic drama films
American romantic drama films
American silent feature films
American black-and-white films
Films about prostitution in France
Films directed by Alan Crosland
Films based on French novels
Films based on works by Antoine François Prévost
Transitional sound films
Warner Bros. films
Films set in the 18th century
1920s historical romance films
American historical romance films
1920s American films
Silent romantic drama films
Silent American drama films
1920s English-language films
Silent historical romance films